Dynamic financial analysis (DFA) is a simulation approach that looks at an insurance enterprise's risks holistically as opposed to traditional actuarial analysis, which analyzes risks individually. Specifically, DFA reveals the dependencies of hazards and their impacts on the insurance company's financial well being such as business mix, reinsurance, asset allocation, profitability, solvency, and compliance.

In addition to projecting stochastic future economic scenarios through using scenario generators such as interest rate, underwriting cycle and jurisdictional risk models, DFA also links the scenarios with the financial models of the targeted insurance company that is being analyzed. Such models not only reveal the operation and the business structure of the company, but also uncover the dependencies among its business practices. Because DFA tries to account for every aspect of the company, it produces a vast amount of data. As a result, analyzing and presenting the outputs effectively is of great importance.

Objectives
DFA is used primarily by financial practitioners to manage profitability and financial stability (the risk control function of DFA) Not only do DFA users seek to maximize shareholder values, but they also try to maintain customer values. Furthermore, outputs from DFA could help managers identify strengths and weaknesses of the following areas.
 Business mix: estimates relative and absolute value of each line of business (e.g. premium and commission level) compared to the company's financial.
 Reinsurance: uncovers the structure of the company's line of businesses such as contract types, interrelation among contracts, and cost of reinsurance.
 Asset allocation: determines whether a company is taking on too much investment risk, which could be minimized through diversification of investments.
 Profitability: measures the profitability of the company's each line of business.
 Solvency: reveals liquidity problems, which are mismatches of cash flows that a company might experience if it did not have enough cash to immediately meet financial obligations.
 Compliance: assesses the likelihood of insurance regulators intervening the company's business due to change in regulations or deteriorating business operations.
 Sensitivity: explores the company's reaction to a change in strategies and economic conditions in the future.
 Dependency: uncovers dependencies of all kinds of risks that are hard to understand without a holistic modeling and analysis tool.

Elements
DFA consists of the following 3 parts:
 Scenarios, generating expected and extreme economic scenarios to assess the company's reaction to changes
 Business Models, quantifying the company's business models and uncovering the dependencies among them
 Analysis Presentation, presenting the analysis to the executives who make strategic decisions

Careful calibration is required to ensure the accuracy of the scenarios and the correlations among business models.

Scenario
The scenario generator must meet the following criteria:
 Generate individual risks while keeping track of their dependencies with one another and with time (e.g., an increase in the price of gasoline might lead to less driving mileages of automobile policy holders, thus leading to fewer car accidents).
 Produce both normal and abnormal behavior of the risk factors (e.g., a 1% change in S&P index is normal; a 40% change is extreme).
 Simulate stochastic scenarios, meaning that scenarios are not the same every time you run the analysis.
 Assign mathematical models that best imitate the behaviors of the risk factors. Such models could be found in, though not exclusively, actuarial science, finance and economic disciplines.
 Track the incurred losses and the development of the losses, specifically the cash flows of the company's operation. This may help managers recognize the need to implement better asset liability management strategies.

Interest rate generator
The interest rate generator is the core fundamental of DFA. Many sophisticated interest rate models were created in the effort to best imitate the real world interest rate behavior. Although none of the existing models are perfect, they have their own advantages and disadvantages. The following is a simple interest rate model used in a publicly access DFA model.

Cox, Ingersoll, and Ross (CIR) interest rate generator
The CIR interest rate model characterizes the short-term interest rate as a mean-reverting stochastic projection. Although CIR was first used to project continuous changes in the interest rates, it is also acceptable to use it to project discrete changes from one time period to another. Below is the formula.

where 
 b = the long-run mean to which the interest rate reverts; the expected interest rate in the long run
 a = the speed of reversion of the interest rate to its long-run mean (e.g., a = 2 means the interest is expected to return to its long-term mean within half a year, and a = 1/5 means it would take 5 years).
  = the current short-term interest rate
  = the volatility of the interest rate process expressed as the standard deviation of historical or projected interest rate changes.

The CIR model has two components: a deterministic  and a stochastic part. The deterministic part will go in the reverse direction of what the current short term rate is heading. In other words, the further the current interest rate is from the long term expected rate, the harder the deterministic part tries to reverse it back to the long term mean.

The stochastic part is purely random; it can either help the current interest rate deviate from its long term mean or the reverse. Because this part is multiplied by the square root of the current interest rate, when the current interest rate is low, its impact is minimum, thus leading to the unlikelihood of the interest rate going below zero, and the interest rate cannot be negative. However, the reverse is true if the current rate is high.

Jurisdictional Risk Generator
In the United States, each state has its own regulatory, jurisdictional and legislative bodies, and there are advantages and disadvantages for an insurance company conducting businesses in different states. For example, some states have restrictions on how much rate increase that an insurance company can charge for the risks on which it takes. Such risk can severely hamper the insurance entity's profitability and operation.

In DFA, jurisdiction risk is reflected in two ways.
 "Acceptable" rate changes: each state has its own limit for how much rate increase in percentage proportional to the existing rate an insurance company can charge without attracting regulators' scrutiny. Under the scenarios, if DFA indicates that the insurance company needs to charge more than the state's maximum limit for the risks, that should raise a red flag to the executives overseeing the insurance business in that region.
 Lag in implementing indicated rate changes: insurance companies often do not immediately implement the approved rate changes, and in fact there is often a lag of 3 to 6 months. The lag, shown in the model in terms of years, is longer in states with harsh rate regulation.

Underwriting Cycles Generator
The number of policies an insurance company can sell depends on the macroeconomic environment of the insurance industry. The DFA scenario accounts for this risk factor to best simulate the nature of insurance business.

Below are four underwriting cycles that an insurance company may experience.
 Mature Hard: Rates can be increased and may still sell more policies
 Mature Soft: Rates need to be decrease in order to sell more policies
 Immature Hard: Transition state from mature soft to mature hard
 Immature Soft: Transition state from mature hard to mature soft

Company and Strategy modeling
To estimate the impacts that the scenarios have on an insurance company, the company's business practices needed to be quantified and linked to the scenario factors such as interest rate and underwriting cycles.

Types of Models
 Cash Flow Oriented Model: Such model tries to imitate the cash flows of the insurance company's assets and liabilities. Also it assess the impacts on the company's financial statement.
 Advantages: It might not be difficult to project cash flows linked to economic factors for the company's assets.
 Disadvantages: Liabilities are often unknown for an insurance company, and thus it is hard to generate outgoing cash flows for claims.
 Simple Model: Such model only account for part of the economic factors of the scenarios
 Advantages: The model is mathematically tractable, and accuracy can be achieved.
 Disadvantages: It defeats the purpose of implementing a DFA, which is to analyze potential impacts that changes in economic factors can have on the insurance company's financial performance.
 Complex Model: Such model not only tries to account for all the economic factors that the scenarios generate, but also the dependencies among the company's lines of business. It involves sophisticated mathematical models and parameter to achieve its goal.
 Advantages: This approach helps executives truly understand the dependencies among its business models and the external impacts on the company's profitability.
 Disadvantages: Such model is very unlikely to be mathematically tractable. In other words, the model can be totally wrong because no one may know the exact dependencies among the business models and the impacts that economic risks can pose to the company.

Analysis and presentation
Without effective analysis and presentation, managers can hardly make any sense out of the vast amount of data that DFA produces. The goal of DFA is to help the managers to find out whether the company's current strategies are in line with its financial goals. Below are some tricks of conducting and presenting DFA analysis.

 Keep communication concise and focused.
 Eliminate, if needed, part of the DFA's outputs that are irrelevant to the company's financial objectives.
 Include no more than four most important results in a brief executive summary, and support your statements with graphs and exhibits in the appendix.
 Focus on business development trend, as opposed to over emphasis on specific numbers or the details of the model. Keep in mind that DFA is only an estimate of what might happen.
 Support the DFA analysis with other available information within the company.

References

Insurance